The Westminster Meeting House is a Friends meeting house (a Quaker place of worship) at 52 St Martin's Lane in Covent Garden, London WC1. It shares its frontage with an adjoining shop. The Westminster friends have been meeting at this location since 1883.

The philosopher Bertrand Russell and the activist Alys Pearsall Smith married in the meeting house in 1894. In Russell's autobiography he relates that the guests at the wedding seemed moved to preach about the Miracle at Cana which offended his bride's teetotal sensibility. The artist Richard Morris Smith made a drawing of their wedding and a photograph of the drawing was donated to the National Portrait Gallery by Barbara Halpern in 1999.

The writer and activist Jennifer Kavanagh has been a member of the Westminster Quaker meeting since 1996.

The meeting house and adjoining shop is listed Grade II on the National Heritage List for England.

The meeting for worship is held on Sundays from 11am to 12pm; on Tuesdays from 1 to 1:30pm and on Wednesdays from 6:15 to 7pm.

References

External links

1883 establishments in England
19th-century Quaker meeting houses
Grade II listed places of worship in the City of Westminster
Grade II listed houses
Grade II listed religious buildings and structures
Quaker meeting houses in London